The 1991 Santa Clara Broncos football team represented Santa Clara University as a member of the Western Football Conference (WFC) during the 1991 NCAA Division II football season. The Broncos were led by seventh-year head coach Terry Malley. They played home games at Buck Shaw Stadium in Santa Clara, California. Santa Clara finished the season with a record of five wins and six losses (5–6, 0–5 WFC). The Broncos outscored their opponents 309–281 for the season.

Schedule

References

Santa Clara
Santa Clara Broncos football seasons
Santa Clara Broncos football